The 2022 UEFA Under-19 Futsal Championship (also known as UEFA Under-19 Futsal Euro 2022) was the second edition of the UEFA Under-19 Futsal Championship, the biennial international youth futsal championship organised by UEFA for the men's under-19 national teams of Europe. The tournament was originally scheduled to be held between 1 and 7 November 2021, but the competition was postponed to 3 to 10 September 2022 due to the COVID-19 pandemic. The tournament was held at the Olivo Arena in Jaén, Spain.

A total of eight teams played in the final tournament, with players born on or after 1 January 2002 eligible to participate. Spain were the defending champions.

They defended the title with a 6–2 win after extra time against Portugal.

Host selection
The following associations had confirmed their plan to bid:

The hosts were originally to be confirmed by the UEFA Executive Committee on 3 December 2020. However, the decision was delayed. On 19 April 2021, the UEFA Executive Committee appointed the Olivo Arena in Jaén, Spain as the tournament host.

Qualification

Seven teams qualified to join the hosts in the final tournament. The qualifying draw was originally to be held on 23 October 2020, but was postponed to 7 July 2021. The preliminary round was originally to be held between 12 and 17 January 2021, and the main round was originally to be held between 23 and 28 March 2021. However, this was postponed due to the COVID-19 pandemic in Europe, and rescheduled to 2–7 November 2021 for the preliminary round, and 15–20 March 2022 for the main round.

1 Bold indicates champions for that year. Italic indicates hosts for that year.

Squads
Each national team have to submit a squad of 14 players, two of whom must be goalkeepers.

Group stage
The final tournament schedule was announced on 25 June 2022.

The final tournament draw was made on 14 July 2022 in Jaén.

The group winners and runners-up advance to the semi-finals 

Tiebreakers

In the group stage, teams are ranked according to points (3 points for a win, 1 point for a draw, 0 points for a loss), and if tied on points, the following tiebreaking criteria are applied, in the order given, to determine the rankings (Regulations Articles 18.01 and 18.02):
Points in head-to-head matches among tied teams;
Goal difference in head-to-head matches among tied teams;
Goals scored in head-to-head matches among tied teams;
If more than two teams are tied, and after applying all head-to-head criteria above, a subset of teams are still tied, all head-to-head criteria above are reapplied exclusively to this subset of teams;
Goal difference in all group matches;
Goals scored in all group matches;
Penalty shoot-out if only two teams have the same number of points, and they met in the last round of the group and are tied after applying all criteria above (not used if more than two teams have the same number of points, or if their rankings are not relevant for qualification for the next stage);
Disciplinary points (red card = 3 points, yellow card = 1 point, expulsion for two yellow cards in one match = 3 points);
UEFA coefficient for the qualifying round draw;
Drawing of lots.

Group A

Group B

Knockout stage
In the knockout stage, extra time and penalty shoot-out are used to decide the winner if necessary.

Bracket

Semi-finals

Final

Goalscorers
5 goals

 Nicolás Marrón
 Pablo Ordoñez

4 goals

 Diego Furtado
 Juan Moreno
 Álex García
 Jorge Carrasco
 Yaroslav Kvasnii

3 goals

 Kamil Roll
 Szymon Licznerski
 Kacper Sendlewski
 Kutchy
 Albert Ortas
 Adrián Rivera
 Oleksandr Dychuk

2 goals

 Tonino Zorotović
 Romeo Sušac
 Filip Josipović
 Dominik Čičić
 Rodrigo Simão
 Diogo Santos
 Tomás Colaço
 Rostyslav Semenchenko
 Oleksandr Smetanenko

1 goal

 Marko Pest-Mundvajl
 Gabrijel Lasić
 Domagoj Đurković
 Duje Dragičević
 Lovro Cigler
 Houmany Dembele
 Sofiane Alla
 Amin Benslama
 Valerio Capponi
 Tommaso Ansaloni
 Gabriel Pazetti
 Leonardo Scavino
 Lucas
 Miłosz Krzempek
 Filip Turkowyd
 Pedro Santos
 Tiago Velho
 Rúben Teixeira
 Janos-Csongor Csog
 Attila Hegyi
 Jorge Espín
 Adrián Tapias
 Nacho Gómez
 Guido García Sánchez
 Ion Cerviño
 Maksym Malynovskyi
 Sava Lutai
 Dmytro Skybchyk

1 own goal

 Lucas (playing against Portugal)
 Ion Cerviño (playing against Portugal)

Broadcasting

Television 
All 15 matches will be live streamed in selected countries (including all unsold markets) and highlights are available for all territories around the world on UEFA.tv.

Participating nations

Non-participating European nations

Outside Europe

Radio

Participating nations

Non-participating European nations

Outside Europe

References

External links

2022
2022–23 in European futsal
2022 in youth association football
September 2022 sports events in Spain
Sports events postponed due to the COVID-19 pandemic
International futsal competitions hosted by Spain
2022–23 in Spanish football